The 2020–21 season was the 5th season in the existence of Real Madrid Femenino and the club's first season after being officially rebranded as part of Real Madrid. In addition to the domestic league, they participated in the Copa de la Reina.

David Aznar returned for his third campaign as coach. While the club inherited the TACÓN squad, a number of new signings were made to bolster the squad's odds of challenging for silverware in their first season as part of Real Madrid. Misa Rodríguez was signed from Deportivo de La Coruña to be the team's starting goalkeeper while Ivana Andrés was another notable signing from Levante as the central defender quickly became club captain.

The club also made a signing which, despite the lack of disclosed information on transfers in women's football, would probably have been amongst the most lucrative of all time. Maite Oroz signed from Athletic Club, and the Basque club was reportedly requesting €250,000 in formation fees for Oroz. At the time, this fee would have broken the women's transfer record set by Rayo Vallecano in 2002 when the club purchased Milene Domingues from Fiammamonza for €235,000. However, as Oroz (and former teammate Damaris Egurrola) were out of contract with Bilbao, the legality of the formation fees imposed on their new clubs was challenged and a Spanish court eventually found that Bilbao were not owed a fee.

Competitions

Overall record

Primera División

League table
<onlyinclude>

Copa de la Reina 

The draw for the quarter-finals took place on 5 April 2021.

References

External links

Real Madrid Femenino seasons
2020–21 in Spanish women's football
Spanish football clubs 2020–21 season